Ingrid Remmers (26 March 1965 – 9 August 2021) was a German politician. She represented The Left and served as a member of the Bundestag from the state of North Rhine-Westphalia from 2009 until 2013 and from 2017 until her death in 2021.

Life 
Ingrid Remmers was born in Ibbenbüren, North Rhine-Westphalia. She attended the Bodelschwingh secondary school in Ibbenbüren. She then trained as an office administrator at a newspaper publisher and then worked as a production assistant at a supplier to the Bochum site of the Opel car company. Remmers began her second educational path at the Comenius College in Mettingen. There Remmers completed her A-levels and then studied social sciences at the Ruhr University in Bochum from 1993 in the field of economics and associations. She was a member of the Bundestag from 2009 to 2013. She became member of the bundestag after the 2017 German federal election. She was a member of the Committee on Transport and Digital Infrastructure.

Remmers died on 9 August 2021, aged 56.

References

External links 

  
 Bundestag biography 

1965 births
2021 deaths
People from Ibbenbüren
Members of the Bundestag for North Rhine-Westphalia
Female members of the Bundestag
21st-century German women politicians
Members of the Bundestag 2017–2021
Members of the Bundestag 2009–2013
Members of the Bundestag for The Left